Jean-Baptiste Chavannes (born 1947 in Haiti), educated as an agronomist.

Biography
Chavannes founded the Papaye Peasant Movement (MPP) in 1973 to teach Haitian principles of sustainable agriculture. The MPP has become one of the most effective peasant movements of Haiti's history, succeeding in terms of economic development, environmental protection and the survival of each.

Chavannes continues his work despite the political climate in Haiti, which remains unstable. He has been exposed to several assassination attempts during periods of political destabilization in Haiti. Death threats have forced into exile between 1993 and 1994. He received the Goldman Environmental Prize in 2005.

See also

 Haitian Heritage Museum
 Papaye peasant movement
 Sustainable development
 Sustainable food system
 Sustainable landscaping

References

External links
 The MPP
 "Haiti Is Going From Catastrophe to Catastrophe": Michael Deibert interviews Chavannes Jean-Baptiste, Inter Press Service, September 2008

Living people
Haitian agronomists
Haitian environmentalists
History of Haiti
Sustainable agriculture
Agroecology
Sustainable food system
1947 births
Goldman Environmental Prize awardees